Allendale Chert Quarries Archeological District is a set of 14 prehistoric archaeological sites located near Martin, Allendale County, South Carolina. The district includes the quarries and sites related to the processing of chert located on the bank of the Savannah River at distances of up to 1-1/2 miles away from the river.

It was added to the National Register of Historic Places in 1985.

References

Quarries in the United States
Archaeological sites on the National Register of Historic Places in South Carolina
Historic districts on the National Register of Historic Places in South Carolina
National Register of Historic Places in Allendale County, South Carolina